Santa Hooked Me Up is the second studio album and only Christmas album by R&B group B2K, released on October 29, 2002. It was released just two months before the release of the group's third album, Pandemonium!. A music video as shot for "Why'd You Leave Me on Christmas".

Track listing
 "Santa Hooked Me Up" produced by " My Favorite Color " - 3:29
 "Rain And Snow" - 3:35
 "Jingle Bells" - 3:16
 "Sexy Boy Christmas" (featuring TG4) - 3:22
 "Everyone's Home for Christmas" (featuring Batman of IMx) - 4:20
 "Santa Claus Is Coming to Town" - 3:07
 "Why'd You Leave Me on Christmas" - 3:53
 "Rudolph the Red-Nosed Reindeer" - 2:16
 "My First Christmas" (featuring IMx) - 3:39
 "Santa Baby" (featuring Jhené Aiko) - 2:45
 "Why'd You Leave Me on Christmas" - 2:45

References

 
2002 Christmas albums
Christmas albums by American artists
Pop Christmas albums
Contemporary R&B Christmas albums
Epic Records albums